Ancylis gigas is a moth of the family Tortricidae. It is found in Vietnam.

The wingspan is 22.5 mm. The ground colour of the forewings is olive brown, tinged yellowish green dorsally and ferruginous in the apex area where two fine crossing silver lines occur. The hindwings are brown, but brownish white proximally.

Etymology
The name refers to large size of the moth and is derived from Greek gigas (meaning giant).

References

Moths described in 2009
Enarmoniini
Moths of Asia
Taxa named by Józef Razowski